Unplugged (also known as Dato' Siti Nurhaliza Unplugged) is a live album by Malaysian recording artist Siti Nurhaliza. It was released in multiple formats, both physical and digital in Malaysia on 30 June 2015. The main live tracks were all taken from her 2015 unplugged concert at Istana Budaya on 7 April 2015. The CD, digital download and LP record versions of the album however come with three new bonus songs, "Menatap dalam Mimpi" ("Staring in a Dream"), "Engkau" ("You") and "Mikraj Cinta" ("Ascension of Love"). All were recorded specifically to accompany the three audio releases.

On June 21, 2015, "Mikraj Cinta", one of its bonus tracks was released as an official debut single for the album. On 25 August 2015, another two of Unplugged bonus tracks were nominated for the 2015 Anugerah Planet Muzik. "Menatap dalam Mimpi" is nominated for the category of Best Artiste (Female) while "Engkau" is nominated for the Best Collaboration (Song). On December 18, 2016, Unplugged received four awards from seven nominations from 22nd Anugerah Industri Muzik, including for Best Vocal Performance in a Song (Female), Best Nasyid Song for "Mikraj Cinta", Best Musical Arrangement in a Song for "Menatap dalam Mimpi", and Best Album.

Background and recording 

In the creation process of this record, the main performances are all taken from her one night only 2015 unplugged concert on 7 April 2015. The planning and the execution of the whole live concert took Siti and her team less than three weeks. Although the whole process was done at the eleventh hour, the concert was a success. Held at Istana Budaya, all the tickets sold out days before the concert date and the concert was lauded by critics especially for Siti's vocal performances. The concert also marked her 20th year in the Malaysian music industry ever since she won 1995 Bintang HMI at the age of 16.

The inclusion of bonus tracks to accompany the audio releases of the album was done after the concert. One of the tracks, "Mikraj Cinta" (Ascension of Love), a track written by Hafiz Hamidun and Ahmad Fedtri Yahya was actually first performed live during her performance for "Sirah Rasullulah" (Life of the Messenger of God) on 3, 4 and 7 January 2015 in conjunction with Prophet Muhammad's mawlid. Inspired from the event of Isra and Mi'raj, a violinist from West Asia was hired to provide an original Arabic sound.  The remaining two bonus tracks, "Engkau" (You) and "Menatap dalam Mimpi" (Observing in Dream or figuratively Staring in a Dream) were produced by Aubrey Suwito with the lyrics of the two were provided by Ade Govinda and Rozi Sang Dewi respectively. According to Aubrey, he was inspired to produce the melody for "Menatap dalam Mimpi" upon seeing a poem that was uploaded by Rozi on her Twitter account. He completed the whole song in only 20 minutes. Recorded at Aubrey's recording studio, according to Siti, "It possesses the musical elements that require me to diversify the usage of my vocal range. It would not be wrong for me to say, that it is like a musical song that we often heard in films by Walt Disney."

For the iTunes version of the album, two more additional bonus tracks are added, which are essentially the acoustic version of "Menatap dalam Mimpi" and "Engkau". According to Rozi, who is also Siti's personal manager, the two additional tracks are a "bonus to the bonus tracks".

Synopsis 

The concert began with Siti performing "Membunuh Benci" while accompanied by Aubrey Suwito on piano, who was the musical director for the concert. This was followed by the first medley of the unplugged concert, composed of the first two upbeat songs of the show, "Mahligai Asmara" and "Satu Cinta Dua Jiwa" where she started to dance while singing. She resumed her performance by performing the second medley of the concert composed of "Jawapan di Persimpangan", "Purnama Merindu" and "Diari Hatimu" and followed by another medley composed of "Aku Cinta Padamu" and "Biarlah Rahsia". For the next performance she invited Awi Rafael, the composer of "Mula dan Akhir," to accompany her on guitar while she sang the tune that he composed for her most recent album, Fragmen. Siti returned to upbeat songs in a medley of "Tanpa Kalian" and "Intrig Cinta" before she went to perform another medley of her ballads, "Usah Diragui", "Wajah Kekasih" and "Kau Kekasihku". Before the second half begins, the audience is entertained by the musicians and the background singers who performed "Seindah Biasa".

In the second half of the concert, Siti invited Faizal Tahir to accompany her on guitar while she sang "Aku" and "Warna Dunia", the former of which was composed by Faizal for Fragmen. Later she also invited Dato' Adnan Abu Hassan to accompany her on piano to the songs that were written and composed by him, "Jerat Percintaan" and "Gelora Asmara". She resumed her performance with another three medleys. The first one is a medley of cover songs, "Epilog Cinta dari Bromley" by Sohaimi Mior Hassan and "Suratan Atau Kebetulan" by Kenny, Remy and Martin, followed by a medley of her songs again which was a medley of "Engkau Bagaikan Permata" and "Cahaya Seribu Liku". The final medley of the concert was a medley of three songs from Fragmen that were written by Indonesian songwriters and composers — "Sanubari", "Terbaik Bagimu" and "Kau Sangat Bererti". She finished the show by performing all the songs from Fragmen that were released as singles including "Jaga Dia Untukku", "Lebih Indah" and "Seluruh Cinta".

Throughout the concert she intermittently shared some details from her 20 years' worth of life and singing experiences, from her first recording session to her experiences in recording her latest album, Fragmen. Apart from the three guests artists, she also invited two lucky fans to accompany her on the stage – first before the performance of "Aku Cinta Padamu" and another one before the performance of "Tanpa Kalian".

Release and promotion 

The album was made available simultaneously for download and stream on various platforms including iTunes, Spotify and Deezer on 30 June 2015. It was officially launched at The Duchess Place, Kuala Lumpur on 2 July 2015. The album also marked her first album to ever be released in the LP record (vinyl) format. She also made an appearance on several television shows to promote the album, including on Wanita Hari Ini (Women Today) on TV3 and Muzik-Muzik, also on TV3.

To help promote the album, three meet and greet sessions were held at three separate locations – Plaza Angsana, Johor Bahru, Johor (29 August), Sunway Carnival Mall, Seberang Jaya, Penang (6 September) and Pavilion, Bukit Bintang, Kuala Lumpur (13 September).

Commercial performance 
In less than a day after the album was released to iTunes, it went straight to atop of the charts for three different countries – Malaysia, Singapore and Brunei. For the physical release of the album, 5000 copies were shipped in its first week alone.

Track listing

Personnel 
Credits adapted from Unplugged booklet liner notes.

Main concert 

 Adzwa – dance instructor
 Alud @ Khairul Azmir Abdul Hamid – concert manager, concert administrator
 Aniza – dancer
 Aubrey Suwito – musical director, post production, arrangement, piano
 Awi Rafael – guest artist
 Chandelier Trust Lighting Collection – sponsor
 Dato' Adnan Abu Hassan – guest artist
 Dato' Mohamed Juhari Shaarani – adviser
 Dato' Siti Nurhaliza – executive producer, vocals
 Derrick Siow – drums
 Fadzliana – dancer
 Faizal Tahir – guest artist
 Fara Wahida – dancer
 Firdaus Dalip – monitor engineer
 'Fly' Halizor Hussein – electric bass, upright bass
 Joel Voo – acoustic guitar
 Juanita – background vocals
 Lentera Creative Home – sponsor
 Lim Jae Sern – violin
 Marina – dancer
 Miela @ Norfazilah Abu Seman – management/production
 Mohd Azli Othman – compere
 Mohd Rafi Shafie – acoustic guitar
 Moke Printing – sponsor
 Nur Iman @ Aiman – production manager
 Nurul Shuhada – dancer
 Nurul Shukor – make-up artist
 Ozlan Othman – lighting director
 Paradigm Studio – photography
 Rizman Ruzaini – wardrobe designer, sponsor
 Rozi Abdul Razak – idea, concept, script, coordinator
 Shaun Paiva – assistant sound engineer/recording, 
 Siti Norsaida Tarudin – management/production
 Steve Thornton – percussion
 Sunil Kumar – sound engineer/recording, mixing
 Syaiful Rasyidi @ Ad – technical director
 Widy – background vocals
 Zaramiz Sdn. Bhd. – sponsor

Istana Budaya workforce 
Production

 Mohd Azli Othman – production
 Mohd Ferdaus Hassan – production
 Rozita Ismail – production
 Suhaimi Abdul Rahim – production

Management

 Azhar Mohamad – management
 Harttzery Nazry Hatta – management
 Kamarulanuar Ismail – management
 M Ramlee Hj Ismail – management
 Mohd Ridhuan Wan Mohd Zin – management
 Mohd Yusoff Bokhri – management

Audiovisual unit

 Hakimi Mohd Zain – audiovisual unit
 Jafri Hasan – audiovisual unit
 Mohamad Yusri Zain – audiovisual unit
 Mohd Zunohan Md Noor – audiovisual unit
 Mohd Zul'amri Amran – audiovisual unit
 Muhamad Fadzli Ramli – audiovisual unit

Stage management

 Anuar Mohamad Kassim – stage management
 Azrulnizam Aziz – stage management
 Barat Anak Echan – stage management
 Mohd Anuar Zakaria – stage management
 Mohd Sujak Othman – stage management
 Mohd Sufri Mohamad – stage management
 Sha'ari Hashin – stage management
 Yuzaidi Md Yusuf – stage management

Art and design

 Abdul Razak Abdol Rahim – art and design
 Mohd Azali Idris – art and design
 Mohd Khairul Adnan Khalid – art and design
 Rudy Efendy Jammakhir – art and design
 Sazali Ismail – art and design

Technical

 Ahmad Ruzaini Bin Mohd Sharif
 Ahmad Tarmizi Muhammad
 Amir Bin Abu
 Amir Husni Bin Hamidun
 Azhari Bin Abdul Rashid
 Azli Bin Baharuddin
 Azri Bin Seman
 Azzazial Bin Shuib
 Fareez Bin Sadikon
 Ilmi Bin Cek Hamid
 Ismail B. Mohammad
 Khairul Aizat Bin Alias
 Khairul Anuar Bin Jaafar
 Maharini Binti Bidin
 Mat Nuri Bin Mat Ali
 Mohammad Fairolnizam Bin Ali Othman
 Mohammad Faizal Bin Hj. Hamid
 Mohammed Herman Bin Majid
 Mohd Alizar Bin Sulaiman
 Mohd Fyrulnizam Bin Mohd Yusof
 Mohd Halimi Bin Hassan
 Mohd Nizam Abu Bakar
 Mohd Nizam B. Bakar
 Mohd Rizal Bin Johari @ Razak
 Mohd Yusoff Bin Kassim
 Muhammad Zaki Bin Abu Samah
 Nik Mohd Fadzir Bin Nik Ismail
 Osmar Bin Fariez
 Salleh Bin Muhammad
 Suzahani Bin Shuib
 Tines Kumar A/L Murugasu
 Wan Ayubee B. Wan Razoly
 Wan Mohd Azam Bin Wan Ishak
 Wan Zahari Bin Wan Ismail
 Zulkeflee Bin Husin

Front of House

 Abdul Malik Bin Osman
 Ahmad Jamri Bin Jamaluddin
 Aniza Bt. Baharom
 Azman Bin Abu Bakar
 Azrita Aida Bt. Abdul Aziz
 Boniface Anak Babai
 Fauziah Hanim Bt. Mohd. Zain
 Halimattun Bt. Mohd Nor
 Hamdan Bin Awang
 Hanipah Bt. Hairi
 Hasnul Bin Hassan
 Jailani Bin Abdul Razak
 Marina Mary Charles
 Md Firdaus Bin Alias
 Mohamad Nizam Bin Elias
 Mohd Aizat Bin Rusly
 Norhashimah Bt. Leman
 Nor Haslinda Bt. Abdul Manaf
 Nor Zulzaliana Bt. Yahya
 Nurul Wahida Bt. Zulkifli
 Roslinah Bt. Haroun
 Roszilawati Bt. Abd Rahim
 Rudy De Luna Jr
 Saniah Bt. Aziz
 Siti Norhabsah Bt. Syeikh Ahmad
 Siti Sarah Bt. Abdul Kalam
 Syaira Dalina Bt. Abdullah
 Zamri Bin Mohamad

Album 
 Performers and musicians

 Ade Govinda – composer (track 17), lyricist (track 17)
 Aji – guitar (track 16, 17)
 Aksana Yupusova – violin (track 16, 17)
 Alla Yanisheva – violin (track 16, 17)
 Aubrey Suwito – composer (track 16), production (track 16, 17), arrangement (track 16, 17), music programming (track 16, 17)
 Brian Larson – violin (track 16, 17)
 Dato' Siti Nurhaliza – vocals (track 1–18)
 Emre Moğulkoç – strings (track 18)
 Fedtri Yahya – lyricist (track 18)
 Florian Antier – cello (track 16, 17)
 Greg Henderson – mixing (track 18)
 Hafiz Hamidun – composer (track 18), lyricist (track 18), arrangement (track 18), background vocals (track 18)
 Jae Sern Lim – violin (track 16, 17)
 Jay Franco (Sterling Sound) – mastering (track 1–18)
 Kelly – bass (track 18)
 Nasran Nawi – cello (track 16, 17)
 Rozi Sang Dewi –  lyricist  (track 16)
 Sunil Kumar – mixing (track 1–17)
 Toko Inomoto – viola (track 16, 17)
 Veronika Thoene – viola (track 16, 17)
 Wan Saleh – music programming (track 18)
 Yap Yen – violin (track 16, 17)
 Zul Visa – guitar (track 18)

Technical Personnel

 Dato' Siti Nurhaliza – executive producer
 Elaine – promotional unit (Universal Music Group)
 Fiffy – promotional unit (Universal Music Group)
 Idiaz Ismail – creation
 Kamal – promotional unit (Universal Music Group)
 Mujahid Abdul Wahab – executive producer
 Nino – artist and repertoire
 Niza Nor – creation
 Nurul Shukor (Nurul Shukor Touch) – make-up
 Rizman Ruzaini – wardrobe
 Rozi Abdul Razak –  promotional unit (Siti Nurhaliza Productions)
 Sander – promotional unit (Universal Music Group)
 Syamir – promotional unit (Universal Music Group)
 WANPA – wardrobe
 Zepi – promotional unit (Universal Music Group)

Awards

Anugerah Planet Muzik
On 25 August 2015, two of Unplugged bonus tracks were nominated for the 2015 Anugerah Planet Muzik, an award ceremony that involves musicians and artists from Indonesia, Malaysia and Singapore. "Menatap dalam Mimpi" is nominated for the category of Best Artiste (Female) while "Engkau" is nominated for the Best Collaboration (Song).

Anugerah Industri Muzik
On 13 October 2016, Unplugged received seven nominations for six categories from 22nd Anugerah Industri Muzik (AIM 22). Two of its bonus tracks received four nominations - "Menatap dalam Mimpi" is nominated for Best Vocal Performance in a Song (Female), Best Musical Arrangement in a Song, and Best Pop Song while "Mikraj Cinta" is nominated for Best Nasyid Song. The live version of "Jaga Dia Untukku" that was performed at the concert also received the nomination for the Best Musical Arrangement in a Song.

Unplugged on its own received multiple nominations, including for the Best Engineered Album and Best Album. During the award ceremony, she received five awards, including fan-voted Choice Malaysian Singer. AIM 22 also marked her 13th time winning Best Vocal Performance and fifth time winning the Best Album category.

Release history

Explanatory notes

See also
 Dato' Siti Nurhaliza Unplugged 2015

References

External links
 Unplugged at Discogs
 Unplugged at Deezer

2015 live albums
2015 video albums
Live video albums
Universal Music Group live albums
Universal Music Group video albums
Siti Nurhaliza live albums
Malay-language live albums
Malay-language video albums
Siti Nurhaliza video albums